Fatima Togbe, whose full name is Kike Fatima Togbe-Olory, is the founder and executive director of Hayati Communications Group, a media & entertainment agency that primarily focuses on improving and empowering the lives of Muslim women across West Africa. She launched Hayati Magazine in 2012, Hayati Retail in 2015, Hayati Fashion Week in July 2017, and Hayati Magazine Français in October 2017.

Campaigns
Fatima appeared in two for Vlisco's 2017 campaigns (S2-2017 and S3-2017), which celebrated the different and unique ways African women wear vlisco.
She has also represented Nestle brands, Goldern Morn Nigeria and Maggi, as their brand ambassador.

Recognition
 The Future Awards Africa Nigeria Prize for Media Enterprise - 2016 Nominee
 YNaija #WOKE100 List 2017
 A Nasty Boy 2017 #Nasty40 list

References

Year of birth missing (living people)
Living people
Nigerian fashion businesspeople